Lakshmi Rai, professionally credited as Raai Laxmi, is an Indian actress and model who predominantly works in Tamil, Telugu, Malayalam film industries along with few films in Kannada and Hindi languages.

Early life
Raai Laxmi was born in Belgaum, Karnataka to Ram Rai and Manjula Rai. She belongs to the Saurashtrian Kutchi community.

Acting career

Early career (2005–2010)
In 2005, Laxmi made her film debut in the Tamil-language Karka Kasadara after director R. V. Udayakumar saw her performance in the Kannada short film Valmiki. Subsequently, she appeared in a number of Tamil films, including the comedy film Kundakka Mandakka (2005) opposite R. Parthiban, Perarasu's action-masala flick Dharmapuri (2006) and the romance film Nenjai Thodu (2007).

In 2008, she began working in more serious films such as the drama film Velli Thirai, in which she played herself, and the action thriller Dhaam Dhoom, directed by Jeeva. She received positive feedback for her portrayal of a lawyer in the latter. A review from Behindwoods wrote: "The latter (Raai Laxmi) sizzles even as she is supposed to play the court professional who is caught in the web of smuggling drugs". She won her first Filmfare Award nomination in the Best Supporting Actress category.

She made her debut in Malayalam in 2007, starring in Rock n' Roll, opposite Mohanlal. She followed it up with several successful films such as Annan Thampi (2008), 2 Harihar Nagar (2009), Evidam Swargamanu (2009) opposite Mohanlal, and Chattambinadu (2009) opposite Mammootty. She appeared in three Tamil films in 2009, Muthirai, Vaamanan and Naan Avanillai 2.

In Vaamanan (2009), she played a glamorous supermodel. In 2010, she was seen in three films. She made special appearances during song sequences in two of them, In Ghost House Inn and Pen Singam and portrayed a cowgirl in the Tamil film Irumbukkottai Murattu Singam.

Public recognition and success (2011–2014)

Raai Lakshmi's first 2011 release was Christian Brothers. Her next two films were Tamil projects, the comedy horror Kanchana and the Venkat Prabhu-directed action thriller Mankatha, starring Ajith Kumar. She played a negative character in the latter, which was received positively by critics. Following Kanchana success, she was signed on to reprise the role in its Kannada remake, Kalpana (2012). Her 2014 films were Irumbu Kuthirai, Aranmanai in Tamil and RajadhiRaja in Malayalam.

Recent work (2016–present)

In 2016, she signed two Tamil films, Bangalore Naatkal and Sowkarpettai. After a brief gap, she performed her second item number opposite Pawan Kalyan in his Telugu film Sardaar Gabbar Singh (2016). She debuted a Hindi film Akira.

She signed to perform her fourth item number with Chiranjeevi in his 150th film Khaidi No. 150 (2017), and later in Motta Shiva Ketta Shiva (2017) in Tamil with Raghava Lawrence. Raai Laxmi portrayed the lead role in her second Hindi film Julie 2 (2017).

In 2018, she made her comeback to Malayalam cinema with the Mammootty starrer Oru Kuttanadan Blog.

In 2019, she starred in horror movies Where Is the Venkatalakshmi in Telugu then Neeya 2 in Tamil that were failures. She also starred in the Bollywood film, Officer Arjun Singh IPS Batch 2000.

Filmography

Film

Television

Awards and nominations

References

External links

 
 
 
 

21st-century Indian actresses
Actresses from Karnataka
Actresses in Hindi cinema
Actresses in Kannada cinema
Actresses in Malayalam cinema
Actresses in Malayalam television
Actresses in Tamil cinema
Actresses in Telugu cinema
Gujarati people
Indian film actresses
Indian television actresses
Living people
People from Belgaum
Year of birth missing (living people)
South Indian International Movie Awards winners